Jhulia dos Santos (born 18 September 1991) is a visually impaired Brazilian sprinter. Competing in the T11 classification, Dos Santos represented Brazil at the 2012 Summer Paralympics in London winning a bronze medal in the 100m sprint. She is also a multiple World Championships and Parapan American medalist, taking five medals over four tournaments.

References

External links
 

1991 births
Living people
Brazilian female sprinters
Paralympic athletes of Brazil
Paralympic bronze medalists for Brazil
Paralympic medalists in athletics (track and field)
Athletes (track and field) at the 2012 Summer Paralympics
Medalists at the 2012 Summer Paralympics
Medalists at the 2011 Parapan American Games
Medalists at the 2015 Parapan American Games
21st-century Brazilian women
Visually impaired sprinters